Howick  Historical Village is a living museum in Auckland, New Zealand. It is a re-creation of a New Zealand colonial village using surviving buildings from the surrounding area. Despite its name, the Village is actually located in the suburb of Pakuranga.

Village history

The Howick Historical Society was originally formed in May 1962 following a public meeting of people interested in local history.

The development of Howick Historical Village began in 1972 when Bell House was offered to the Society. The local council offered five acres of land next to Bell House to be used to form the village. This was later extended to a total of seven acres.

It took eight years to develop the area into a living museum using volunteer labour. Over this time, a number of historical buildings were offered to the Society which were all relocated to the village. The work was funded largely from the sale of Christmas cards and from cake stalls.

On 8 March 1980, the Howick Colonial Village was officially opened by Allan Highet, Minister of Internal Affairs, on behalf of Governor-General Sir Keith Holyoake, who was unwell on the day. At this stage, the village consisted of fourteen buildings.

It was later renamed to become Howick Historical Village, and it was further developed to incorporate more than 30 buildings alongside a pond and historical gardens. 

The development and operation of the village was funded from admission fees, income generated from events and bookings, donations, plus some funding from The Howick Local Board.

Since 2016, the village has been used as a set to film for the YouTube group Viva La Dirt League.

Governance
The village is owned and operated by the Howick & Districts Historical Society Incorporated, which is a registered charity.

As an incorporated society, any individual can become a member on payment of an annual subscription. Members elect a board each year at the annual general meeting. The board consists of a president, secretary, treasurer and up to seven members.

Visiting
The village is open to the public every day of the year (except Christmas Day, New Year's Day, and Good Friday) from 10am-4pm (last entry at 3pm). Live Days are held periodically, when costumed volunteers re-enact daily life in Victorian New Zealand times. 

School groups continue to visit the Museum regularly as part of their LEOTC (Learning Experience Outside The Classroom) studies. Weddings and other private celebrations are regularly held at the village using the church for ceremonies and the historic Bell House. The village is also offered as a film shoot location.

Restoration projects

Over the years, a number of restoration projects have taken place throughout the village. These buildings are timber framed and require significant ongoing work to protect and preserve them.  

In 2016, a project was commenced to restore Sergeant Ford's Fencible cottage. This project was started with the support of the New Zealand Lottery Grants Board. During the project, further deterioration of the foundation was found, extending the cost of the project by $30,000 and causing significant financial difficulties for the village. The village needed to source additional support in order to prevent stress on the Society's financial reserves, and the project was ultimately rescued with support from the Stevenson Village Trust.

In 2019, the large Pakuranga school house was restored with funding provided by lotteries commission. Significant work by a team of contractors and volunteers completed this vital weather proofing work which included repairs to the windows and weatherboards.

COVID-19 response and temporary closure
On 22 March 2020, the village announced that it was closing to the public due to the COVID-19 pandemic.  The museum and adjoining cafe, which operates under independent management, has since reopened at level 1.

The village claimed $113,666.40 in wage subsidies for 21 employees as part of the New Zealand government's assistance scheme for businesses that suffered financially during the COVID-19 pandemic.

On 26 May 2020, the village reported that it had suffered serious financial difficulties as a result of the COVID-19 pandemic, had cut staff, and was actively seeking financial support from Auckland Council and other agencies. It remained closed and made the majority of its paid staff redundant. It subsequently claimed a further $30,918.40 of public funding for its remaining seven paid employees as part of the government's Wage Subsidy Extension scheme.

It was the only institution forming part of the Museums of Auckland group that did not fully reopen to the general public after COVID-19 restrictions were lifted across New Zealand. It was partially opened for private venue hire (including events and filming) and for school visits, but closed again when lockdown re-commenced on Wednesday 12 August 2020. The village continued to receive its usual annual public funding from the Howick Local Board, with $337,202 allocated for the 2020–21 financial year, but unlike some members of the group, ongoing public financial support is not absolutely guaranteed – Auckland Art Gallery, Auckland Zoo and The Maritime Museum are run by Regional Facilities Auckland), while Auckland Museum and MOTAT receive funding from Auckland Council each year as mandated by legislation. In order to re-open it was awarded a grant of $500,000 as part of the New Zealand government's Strategic Tourism Assets Protection Programme.

References

External links
Howick Historical Village
The collections of Howick Historical Village

Howick Local Board Area
Museums in Auckland
Open-air museums in New Zealand